New Territories East was a geographical constituency in the election for the Legislative Council of Hong Kong in 1991, which elects two members of the Legislative Council using the dual-seat constituency dual vote system. The constituency covers Tuen Mun District and Yuen Long District in New Territories.

Two by-elections were held on 8 December 1991 and 30 August 1992, after conservative Tai Chin-wah gave up his seat for forging educational qualifications and after democrat Ng Ming-yum died in office respectively. Democrats won Tai's seat while conservatives succeeded Ng.

The constituency was divided and replaced by the New Territories Central, New Territories West, New Territories North-west, and New Territories North constituencies in 1995.

Returned members
Elected members are as follows:

Election results

References 

Constituencies of Hong Kong
New Territories
Constituencies of Hong Kong Legislative Council
1991 establishments in Hong Kong
Constituencies established in 1991